Ohara or Ōhara may refer to:

Places
 Ōhara, Chiba
 Ōhara, Okayama
 Ohara District, Shimane

Companies and organisations
 Ohara Corporation, a manufacturer of precision optical glass
Ohara-ryū, a school of ikebana
 Ohara Museum of Art

Other uses
Ohara (surname), two separate Japanese surnames
Ohara (TV series), U.S. TV series
Ohara, from the anime/manga One Piece, an island in the “West Blue” hemisphere which was blown up by the World Government for trying to uncover the true history of the world. Nico Robin hails from this island.

See also
O'Hara (disambiguation)